Tännassilma may refer to several places in Estonia:

Tännassilma, Järva County, village in Türi Parish, Järva County
Tännassilma, Põlva County, village in Põlva Parish, Põlva County
Tännassilma, Tartu County, village in Elva Parish, Tartu County

See also
Tänassilma (disambiguation)